Pregnancy and Infant Loss Remembrance Day is an annual day of remembrance observed on October 15 for pregnancy loss and infant death, which includes miscarriage, stillbirth, SIDS, ectopic pregnancy, termination for medical reasons, and the death of a newborn. Pregnancy and infant loss is a common experience that has historically been complicated by broadly applied social and cultural taboos to stay silent, a condition that the World Health Organization advocates reversing in favor of open expression. A growing number of public figures have come out in support of open expression, with many leading by example through the disclosure of their personal experiences of pregnancy loss and infant death.

Pregnancy and Infant Loss Remembrance Day is observed in locations including Canada, United States, Australia, Ireland,  and the United Kingdom. Recognition of the holiday has grown since the early 2000s. The day of remembrance includes candle-lighting vigils and a Wave of Light, a worldwide lighting of buildings and monuments.

Overview 
Pregnancy and Infant Loss Remembrance Day serves to promote greater awareness and support for the estimated 1 in 4 individuals and families whose lives are irrevocably altered by the death of their children during pregnancy, at birth, and in infancy. Experiences of loss vary for each individual and family unit; common effects include depression, anxiety, changes in relationships, development of unhealthy coping mechanisms, and Post Traumatic Stress Disorder (PTSD). These effects are often underestimated, misunderstood, or overlooked by health care professionals, friends, and family members, especially when concerning pregnancy loss related bereavement and subsequent grief. 

Advocates believe that formalized day of observation increases public awareness and promotes greater research and understanding to aide in the creation and establishment of programs, resources and services to support and provide assistance to survivors of baby loss and their families, enabling them to overcome their trauma and integrate their bereavement into their life in a healthy manner.

In 2017, the World Health Organization (WHO) reported that there were 4.1 million deaths of infants that were less than one year old. WHO estimated an annual occurrence of 2.6 million stillbirths and between 17 and 22 percent of pregnancies that result in miscarriage. A growing number of public figures have disclosed their personal experiences of pregnancy loss and infant death including Nicole Kidman, Whitney Huston, Gweneth Paltrow, Ali Wong, Michelle Obama, Chrissy Tiegan, John Legend, Meghan Duchess of Sussex and Mark Zuckerberg.

Individual citizens have worked with their representatives to introduce legislation at the municipal, state, provincial and national levels of government in an effort to have October 15 recognized as Pregnancy and Infant Loss Remembrance Day. As of March 2021, the day has been formally recognized in the United States, Canada, and Australia while the United Kingdom observes October 15 as part of their Baby Loss Awareness Week.

International Pregnancy and Infant Loss Remembrance Day

International Pregnancy and Infant Loss Remembrance Day is observed in several localities but is not universally recognized. Individuals, families, and organizations from around the world continue to promote greater public awareness of the prevalence of baby loss and the intense grief that often accompanies the experience. The number of locations that officially observe October 15 as Pregnancy and Infant Loss Remembrance Day has grown since the early 2000s.

The official awareness colors of the cause are pink and blue and are used for the campaign's awareness ribbon.

Wave of Light

Founded in 2003, the Wave of Light invites baby loss families, friends, loved ones and supporting organizations from around the world to join in honor and remembrance on October 15 at 7:00 pm in all time zones. Beginning in the first time zone, illuminations and candles remain lit for a period of at least one hour, with the next time zone lighting in its turn, moving westward as the Wave of Light circumnavigates the globe. Buildings, landmarks, monuments, and venues are illuminated while individuals, families, friends, and supporting organizations participate in lighting candles in remembrance.

Efforts towards official recognition of day

United States
The United States Congress, by Senate Joint Resolution 314, designated the month of October 1988 as "Pregnancy and Infant Loss Awareness Month and authorized and requested the President to issue a proclamation in observance of this month which Ronald Reagan then formalized on October 25, 1988.

In 2001, Robyn Bear, Lisa Brown, and Tammy Novak initiated a campaign and petitioned the federal government and state governors of the United States to make October 15 an official holiday titled Pregnancy and Infant Loss Remembrance Day. Concurrent Resolution 222, which supported the goals and ideals of National Pregnancy and Infant Loss Remembrance Day, was passed in the U.S. House of Representatives on September 28, 2006.

United Kingdom
According to the registered charity the Stillbirth and Neonatal Death Society (Sands), the first Baby Loss Awareness Day was held in the United Kingdom on October 15, 2002 after a group of parents were inspired by the Pregnancy & Infant Loss Remembrance Day in the United States. Baby Loss Awareness Week has been in observance in the UK from October 9–15, since 2003, when the event was expanded into a week, the same year the first official Wave of Light was observed in the UK.

In 2016, Labor MP Vicky Foxcroft offered personal testimony in support of the week of remembrance.

Canada

In 2005, New Brunswick was the first Canadian province to observe Pregnancy and Infant Loss Remembrance Day, an action granted by the New Brunswick Department of Health and Wellness on October 12, 2005. New Brunswick Minister of Health and Wellness Elvy Robichaud called on provincial residents to provide "support, education, and awareness for grieving parents who have lost children during pregnancy or shortly after birth" due to miscarriage and infant death being "a source of grief, often silent, for mothers, fathers, siblings, and grandparents."

In 2008, Manitoba recognized the holiday through Bill 226. In 2015, Ontario enacted Bill 141 which designated October 15 as Pregnancy and Infant Loss Awareness Day, with support for further research and program development. In 2017, Nova Scotia began to observe the holiday on October 15, as Pregnancy and Infant Loss Awareness Day, via Bill 38.

As of 2018, the holiday was nationally recognized in Canada.

Australia

In May 2008, Nicole Ballinger of New South Wales (NSW) contacted her Members of Parliament (MPs) to request help in creating an official Pregnancy and Infant Loss Remembrance Day. Ballinger worked with MPs Joanna Gash and Shelley Hancock. 

John and Kate De'Laney campaigned for recognition of Pregnancy and Infant Loss Remembrance Day in Western Australia (WA). After Kate De'Laney wrote a letter to Premier Colin Barnett to bring Pregnancy and Infant Loss Remembrance Day to greater attention, the WA State Government passed a bipartisan agreement to officially recognize the holiday on October 15, 2014.

The De'Laney's worked with Senator Kristina Keneally to make October 15th nationally recognised by the Australian Parliament. Senators Keneally, Bilyk, McCarthy, and Polley, moved a motion in the upper house Australian Government to make Pregnancy and Infant Loss Remembrance Day an official Australian holiday and on February 17, 2021, the motion, put to the members of the lower house, passed unopposed.

References

External links 

 Pregnancy and Infant Loss (PAIL) Network a Canadian resource network affiliated with Sunnybrook Health Sciences Centre 
 Sands (Stillbirth and Neonatal Death Society) a UK charity for support, bereavement, and research on prevention of baby loss

Observances in Canada
Observances in the United States
Observances in the United Kingdom
Observances in Australia
Human pregnancy
Family member holidays
Remembrance days
October observances
October events
Miscarriage
Stillbirth
Health awareness days